Four Days may refer to:

Four Days (film)
Four Days (album)
Four Days' Battle 1666